Ellen Gray Massey (November 14, 1921 –  July 13, 2014) was an American writer and schoolteacher.

Massey was raised near Nevada, Missouri, and spent some time in Washington, D.C. She received a bachelor's degree in English at the University of Maryland before moving back to Missouri, settling in the Lebanon area. She oversaw a class of high school sophomores, juniors, and seniors who produced Bittersweet, the Ozark Quarterly magazine.

Massey also gave hundreds of talks about the Ozarks.

Works
Massey wrote many books, including the following titles:
 Papa's Gold (2013)
 Footprints in the Ozarks: A Memoir (2011)
 Morning in Nicodemus (2009)
 Her Enemies Blue and Gray (2008)
 New Hope (2004)
 Family Fun and Games: A Hundred Year Tradition (2001)
 The Burnt District (2001)
 Borderland-Homecoming (2000)
 Music of My Soul (1998)
 And Tyler, Too? (1998)
 Home is the Heart (1998)
 A Candle Within Her Soul (1995)

Awards
Massey's writing won a number of awards, including the 2014 Western Writers Spur Award in the juvenile fiction category with Papa's Gold.

References

1921 births
2014 deaths
People from Lebanon, Missouri
University of Maryland, College Park alumni
21st-century American writers
21st-century American women writers
Schoolteachers from Missouri
American women educators